Punta is a rural barangay of Calamba, Laguna in the Philippines. It is situated in the central-south portion of the city.

Geography 
Barangay Punta is located in the western part of Calamba. The barangay is bordered by: Kay-Anlog in the south; Bubuyan in the west; Milagrosa in the east, Palo-Alto in the north-west and Barandal in the north. It has total land area of 331 hectares. Punta is now an industrial barangay in Calamba and its extends in barangay Prinza. The Filinvest Technology Park in Ciudad de Calamba Barangay Punta is under PEZA Philippine Economic Zone Authority . Some of the manufacturing company inside the economic zone is the EXELPACK CORPORATION a packaging company own by a Filipino businessman, Fabtech, Primatech, Cleanpack, Auro a local chocolate manufacturing and some other under PEZA company. Punta is approximately 3 kilometers from barangay Mayapa and 2.5 kilometers from CPIP Calamba Premier International Park in barangay Batino. Some of the exclusive subdivisions in Ciudad de Calamba own by the Filinvest Land is the Montebllo, Punta Alteza.

Demography 
According to 2007 Census, Punta has a population of 2,615, one of the least-populated barangays in Calamba

References

Barangays of Calamba, Laguna